The Roman Catholic Diocese of Borongan (Lat: Dioecesis Boronganensis) is a Roman Rite diocese of the Latin Church of the Catholic Church in the Philippines.

Erected in 1960, from territory in the Diocese of Calbayog, the diocese is a suffragan of the Archdiocese of Palo.

The Diocese of Borongan was created on October 22, 1960 by Pope John XXIII. Bishop Vicente Reyes was the first diocesan bishop of Borongan. On June 19, 1965, the island of Samar was politically divided and the province of Eastern Samar was born thus the island of Samar has three dioceses: Calbayog for Western Samar, Catarman for Northern Samar and Borongan for Eastern Samar.

Eastern Samar has a population of 374,255, 97 percent are Catholics. It is subdivided into 1 city and 22 municipalities. It has a land area of 4,470.75 square kilometers. It is bounded on the north by Northern Samar, on the east by the Philippine Sea, on the west by Western Samar and on the south by Leyte Gulf.
The Diocese of Borongan is divided into three regions, each has two vicariates. Borongan is the seat of the episcopal see.

The diocese has experienced no jurisdictional changes.

Crispin Barrete Varquez was appointed its bishop in 2007.

Ordinaries

Beatification launch
In the 8th of December 1995, the Parish Church of the Immaculate Conception, Guiuan formally launched a beatification movement for Msgr. Donato Guimbaolibot, coinciding with the town fiesta and the celebration of the 400th anniversary of the town's Christian evangelization to the Vatican Council.

See also

Catholic Church in the Philippines

References

Borongan
Borongan
Borongan
Religion in Eastern Samar